The Digital Display Working Group (DDWG) was a group whose purpose was to define and maintain the Digital Visual Interface standard. It was organized by Intel, Silicon Image, Compaq, Fujitsu, HP, IBM and NEC.

It developed the Digital Visual Interface (DVI) standard in 1999.

In 2011, founding member HP wrote the group had not met in 5 years.

References

External links
 

Technology consortia